Astana TV is a Kazakh television channel based in Astana, Kazakhstan, and it is owned and operated by the Nur Media. It were originally launched in March 1993 as Tsesna.

Programs 
 "Status QUO" (Dialogue)
 "Olzha"
 "Kinostan"
 "Kaznet"
 "Main News" (News)
 "Keneskhana"
 "KVN Kazakh League"
 "KHL matches of Barys Astana"

References
 Official website

External links

Television stations in Kazakhstan
Television channels and stations established in 1993